The Az Zubair Field, also known as Az-Zubayr, is an oil field located in southern Iraq, west of Basrah. It is one of the largest fields in the world and was discovered by the Basrah Petroleum Company, an associate of the Iraq Petroleum Company, in 1949.

The development contract has been awarded to a consortium led by Eni (32.81%) with Occidental Petroleum Corporation (23.44%), Korea Gas Corporation (18.75%) and Iraq's state-run Missan Oil Company (25%).

Cancer-risk
Gas, a by-product from the oil-extraction, is burned openly, which produces cancer-linked pollutants. The Iraqi law prohibit gas-burning less than 10 km from people's homes, but BBC found in 2022 gas was being burned as close as 350 meters from people's homes. A leaked report from Ministry of Health (Iraq) blamed air pollution for 20% rise in cancer in Basra between 2015 and 2018. The Iraqi Ministry of Health has banned its employees from speaking about the health damage. Iraqi Environment Minister Jassem al-Falahi later admitted that "pollution from oil production is the main reason for increases in local cancer rates." None of the affected locals have gotten any compensation.

References 

Oil fields of Iraq